Shandel (also known as Shandūl and Shandūr) is a village in Margan Rural District, in the Central District of Hirmand County, Sistan and Baluchestan Province, Iran. At the 2006 census, its population was 916, in 170 families.

References 

Populated places in Hirmand County